Reiser may refer to:

People
 Charles Reiser, safecracker also known as "The Ox"
 Glenda Reiser, Canadian middle distance runner
 Hans Reiser, computer programmer and convicted murderer
 Hans Reiser (actor), German actor (The Great Escape)
 Jean-Marc Reiser, comics artist

 John Reiser, race car driver and businessman from Wisconsin
 Kateryna Skarzhynska (née von Reiser), (1852-1932) Russian philanthropist
 Martin Reiser, attributed as originator of Wirth's law
 Niki Reiser (born 1958), German composer of film music
 Othmar Reiser, ornithologist
 Paul Reiser, actor who starred in the sitcom Mad About You
 Pete Reiser, baseball player also known as "Pistol Pete"
 Rio Reiser, musician in the band Ton Steine Scherben

Computers
 ReiserFS, a filesystem developed by Hans Reiser
 Reiser4, a newer filesystem developed by Hans Reiser

See also
 Reser, a surname